Hasanabad-e Tang Bidkan (also Romanized as Ḩasanābād-e Tang Bīdkān; also known as Ḩasanābād and Ḩasanābād-e Bīdkān) is a village in the Central District of Mobarakeh County, Isfahan Province, Iran. At the 2006 census, its population was 3,024, in 808 families.

References 

Populated places in Mobarakeh County